Austroboletus gracilis is a species of bolete fungus in the family Boletaceae. Originally described as Boletus gracilis by Charles Horton Peck in 1872, it was transferred to the genus Austroboletus by Carl B. Wolfe in 1979.

See also
List of North American boletes

References

External links

gracilis
Fungi described in 1872
Fungi of North America
Taxa named by Charles Horton Peck